The Port Huron Museum is a series of four museums located in Port Huron, Michigan, United States.  It includes the Carnegie Center -- Port Huron Museum, Huron Lightship, Thomas Edison Depot Museum, and Fort Gratiot Lighthouse.  The museum was founded in 1967.

See also
 Carnegie Center (Port Huron Museum)
 
 
Dorothy Henry

External links

History museums in Michigan
Museums in St. Clair County, Michigan
Museum
Museums established in 1967
1967 establishments in Michigan